Dewittville is a small community situated on the Chateauguay River in southern Quebec, Canada, between the towns of Huntingdon and Ormstown, approximately 70 km south-west of Montreal.

The old grist mill, dam, and Chateauguay River are notable attractions.

References 

Communities in Montérégie